The Roma Cup is a Perth Racing Group 3 Thoroughbred horse race held under Weight for Age conditions, over a distance of 1,200 metres at Ascot Racecourse, Perth, Western Australia in May. Prize money is  A$200,000.

History

Grade
1966–1979 -  Principal Race
1980 onwards -  Group 3

Distance
1966 -  miles
1967–1968 - 1 mile
1969–1972 - 7 furlongs
1973 - 1400 metres
1974 - 1600 metres
1975–1979 - 1400 metres
1980 onwards -  1200 metres

Venue
 1966-2016 Belmont Park Racecourse
 2017 onwards Ascot Racecourse

Winners

 2022 - Elite Street
2021 - Money Matters
2020 - Vega Magic
2019 - Vital Silver
2018 - Rock Magic
2017 - Rock Magic
2016 - Battle Hero
2015 - Luckygray
2014 - Magnifisio
2013 - Power Princess
2012 - Luckygray
2011 - Grand Nirvana
2010 - Vain Raider
2009 - Grand Nirvana
2008 - El Presidente
2007 - No Questions
2006 - Is Amazing
2005 - Avenida Madero
2004 - Modem
2003 - Tribula
2002 - Kaprats
2001 - Secret Remedy
2000 - Star System
1999 - Papillion
1998 - Double Blue
1997 - Singing The Blues
1996 - Red Eye Special
1995 - Defensive Play
1994 - Wabasso
1993 - Doctor Golly
1992 - Doctor Golly
1991 - Faneso
1990 - Century God
1989 - Straight Cash
1988 - Miss Muffet
1987 - Beau's Your Uncle
1986 - Hanging In
1985 - Novrak
1984 - Official Receiver
1983 - Wild Side
1982 - Wild Side
1981 - Tangiers
1980 - Tangiers
1979 - National Boy
1978 - Pirate's Den
1977 - Private Section
1976 - Super Red
1975 - Craigie Boy
1974 - Clear Mak
1973 - Clear Mak
1972 - Bernvale
1971 - Star Glitter
1970 - King Orator
1969 - Firelight
1968 - Santaland
1967 - Chemech
1966 - Summer Storm

See also
 List of Australian Group races
 Group races

References

Horse races in Australia
Sport in Perth, Western Australia